Gill Mitchell also known as Gill Fitzgerald (maiden name Gill McBryde) is an English international lawn and indoor bowler.

Bowls career
Under her previous name of Fitzgerald she was part of the fours team that win a bronze medal at the 1996 World Outdoor Bowls Championship in Leamington Spa. In 2002, she was part of the gold medal winning team in the fours at the 2002 Commonwealth Games in Manchester along with Ellen Alexander, Shirley Page and Carol Duckworth.

Mitchell was also singles national champion in 1990 and runner up to Norma Shaw in the 1998 national championships representing Northamptonshire.

In 1995 she won the pairs silver medal (partnering Norma Shaw) and the fours bronze medal at the Atlantic Bowls Championships.

References

Living people
1949 births
Commonwealth Games medallists in lawn bowls
Commonwealth Games gold medallists for England
English female bowls players
Bowls players at the 2002 Commonwealth Games
Medallists at the 2002 Commonwealth Games